Sir Harold Black (9 April 1914 – 19 January 1981) was a British civil servant in Northern Ireland. He was Secretary to the Cabinet and Clerk of the Privy Council from 1965 to 1972, and Deputy Secretary, Northern Ireland Office from 1972 to 1974, following the introduction of direct rule.

References 

 https://www.dib.ie/biography/black-sir-harold-a0684
 https://www.ukwhoswho.com/view/10.1093/ww/9780199540891.001.0001/ww-9780199540884-e-162073
 "Sir Harold Black", The Times, 22 January 1981, 16

Knights Bachelor
Civil servants from Belfast
Members of the Northern Ireland Civil Service
Civil servants in the Northern Ireland Office

People educated at the Royal Belfast Academical Institution

1914 births
1981 deaths